Elektrougli is a town in Noginsky District of Moscow Oblast, Russia, located on the Moscow–Nizhny Novgorod railway,  east of Moscow and  southeast of Noginsk, the administrative center of the district. Population:

Name
In 1899 was established "Elektrougli" (electric coals) factory.

History
Urban-type settlement status was granted to it in 1935. Town status was granted in 1956.

Administrative and municipal status
Within the framework of administrative divisions, it is, together with six rural localities, incorporated within Noginsky District as the Town of Elektrougli. As a municipal division, the Town of Elektrougli is incorporated within Noginsky Municipal District as Elektrougli Urban Settlement.

References

Notes

Sources

External links

Elektrougli Business Directory 
FAMOUS PEOPLE OF THE CITY OF ELEKTROGLI 

Cities and towns in Moscow Oblast
Cities and towns built in the Soviet Union
Moscow Governorate